WTWX-FM (95.9 MHz, "Country 95.9") is a radio station serving the Huntsville, Alabama, market. WTWX-FM is licensed to the nearby city of Guntersville, Alabama. The station is owned and operated by Guntersville Broadcasting Company, Inc.  The station's studios and transmitter are located separately in Guntersville.

The station was assigned the WTWX-FM call letters by the Federal Communications Commission on 1969.

Programming
WTWX-FM broadcasts a country music format.  In addition to their regular music programming, they carry the syndicated talk show The Clay Travis and Buck Sexton Show each weekday.  WTWX-FM broadcasts hourly newscasts from the ABC Radio Network, and breaking news from the Associated Press.  Sports coverage includes broadcasts of Atlanta Braves baseball games, Auburn University football and basketball games, Guntersville High School football games and basketball games. They have broadcast Guntersville High School football for over 60 consecutive years. Some longtime local favorite programming includes The Wake Up Show with Bruce airing weekday mornings since 1958 and The Cabin on the Hill Gospel Show airing Sunday mornings beginning on December 31, 1060. Both programs have continued for decades.

References

External links
WTWX-FM official website

TWX-FM
Country radio stations in the United States
Talk radio stations in the United States
Radio stations established in 1969
Marshall County, Alabama
1969 establishments in Alabama